Tao Bojun (8 December 1937 – 18 January 2009) was a general in the People's Liberation Army of China who served as commander of the Guangzhou Military Region from 1996 to 2002.

He was a representative of the 13th and 14th National Congress of the Chinese Communist Party. He was a member of the 15th Central Committee of the Chinese Communist Party. He was a member of the Standing Committee of the 10th National People's Congress.

Biography
Tao was born in Yongji County, Jilin, Manchukuo on 8 December 1937. He enlisted in the People's Liberation Army (PLA) in July 1951, and joined the Chinese Communist Party (CCP) in October 1961. He graduated from the PLA 6th Artillery School in 1955. He served in the Wuhan Military District for a long time and participated in the Sino-Vietnamese War. In 1985, he was appointed chief of staff of the Chengdu Military Region, he remained in that position until 1992, when he was transferred to Guangzhou and appointed chief of staff of the Guangzhou Military Region. In 1996, he was promoted to become commander, a position he held until 2002. During his term in office, he was responsible for the formation of the PLA garrisons in Hong Kong and Macao.

On 18 January 2009, he died from an illness in Guangzhou, Guangdong, at the age of 71.

He was promoted to the rank of major general (shaojiang) in September 1988, lieutenant general (zhongjiang) in June 1991, and general (shangjiang) in March 1998.

References

1968 births
2009 deaths
People from Yongji County, Jilin
People's Liberation Army generals from Jilin
People's Republic of China politicians from Jilin
Chinese Communist Party politicians from Jilin
Members of the Standing Committee of the 10th National People's Congress
Members of the 15th Central Committee of the Chinese Communist Party
Commanders of the Guangzhou Military Region